KARR may refer to:
 Karr (surname), including a list of people with the name
 KARR (AM), a radio station licensed to Kirkland, Washington, United States
 KARR (Knight Rider), a character from the Knight Rider series
 Aurora Municipal Airport (Illinois)'s ICAO code

See also 

 Carr (disambiguation)
 Kar (disambiguation)
Karre
Karri (disambiguation)